The Catalogue of Triangle Cubics is an online resource containing detailed information about more than 1200 cubic curves in the plane of a reference triangle. The resource is maintained by Bernard Gilbert. Each cubic in the resource is assigned a unique identification number of the form "Knnn" where "nnn" denotes three digits. The identification number of the first entry in the catalogue is "K001" which is the Neuberg cubic of the reference triangle . The catalogue provides, among other things, the following information about each of the cubics listed:
Barycentric equation of the curve
A list of triangle centers which lie on the curve
Special points on the curve which are not triangle centers
Geometric properties of the curve
Locus properties of the curve
Other special properties of the curve
Other curves related to the cubic curve
Plenty of neat and tidy figures illustrating the various properties
References to literature on the curve

The equations of some of the cubics listed in the Catalogue are so incredibly complicated that the maintainer of the website has refrained from putting up the equation in the webpage of the cubic; instead, a link to a file giving the equation in an unformatted text form is provided. For example, the equation of the cubic K1200 is given as a text file.

First few triangle cubics in the catalogue
The following are the first ten cubics given in the Catalogue.

GeoGebra tool to draw triangle cubics

GeoGebra, the software package for interactive geometry, algebra, statistics and calculus application has a built-in tool for drawing the cubics listed in the Catalogue. The command
Cubic( <Point>, <Point>, <Point>, n)
prints the n-th cubic in the Catalogue for the triangle whose vertices are the three points listed. For example, to print the Thomson cubic of the triangle whose vertices are A, B, C the following command may be issued:
Cubic(A, B, C, 2)

See also
 Modern triangle geometry

References

Triangle geometry